The 821st Aero Repair Squadron was a repair squadron during World War I

History
The 821st Aero Repair Squadron was activated in order to provide service and repair to aircraft flying within the United States during World War I.  It was stationed on the grounds of the Indianapolis Motor Speedway, which was closed to racing during the United States' participation in the war. The squadron was in New York awaiting embarkation to France when the Armistice with Germany was signed on 11 November 1918, and as a result did not embark to France.

Stations
 Speedway, Indiana

See also
 List of American Aero Squadrons

References
 Indianapolis Motor Speedway, "Speedway has Plenty of Connections to First 100 Years of Flight", http://www.indianapolismotorspeedway.com/indy500/news/show/36808-speedway-has-plenty-of-connections-to-first-100-years-of-flight/

Sources of information

821

it:Aviation Section, U.S. Signal Corps